The Southwestern Bell Building is a 28-story,  skyscraper constructed to be the headquarters of Southwestern Bell Telephone in downtown St. Louis, Missouri. At the time of its construction it was Missouri's tallest building.

The building, which was one of the first in St. Louis to use setbacks, has 17 individual roofs.

Its architect was Mauran, Russell & Crowell, who also designed the Federal Reserve Bank of St Louis and the Railway Exchange Building (St. Louis). I.R. Timlin, Southwestern Bell's company architect, was associate architect on the project.

References

External links 
 B116 - Original Southwestern Bell Headquarters Building -vincestlouis.com

Office buildings completed in 1926
Skyscraper office buildings in St. Louis
Telecommunications company headquarters in the United States
Downtown St. Louis
Buildings and structures in St. Louis
1926 establishments in Missouri